Antonio Ocegueda (born 18 May 1993) is a Mexican male badminton player. He competed at the 2011 and 2015 Pan American Games. In 2014, he won the silver medal in the mixed team event and the bronze medal in the men's doubles event at the Central American and Caribbean Games.

Achievements

Central American and Caribbean Games 
Men's Doubles

BWF International Challenge/Series
Men's Doubles

 BWF International Challenge tournament
 BWF International Series tournament
 BWF Future Series tournament

References

External links
 

1993 births
Living people
Mexican male badminton players
Pan American Games competitors for Mexico
Badminton players at the 2011 Pan American Games
Badminton players at the 2015 Pan American Games
Central American and Caribbean Games silver medalists for Mexico
Central American and Caribbean Games bronze medalists for Mexico
Competitors at the 2014 Central American and Caribbean Games
Central American and Caribbean Games medalists in badminton